Worship Is the Cleansing of the Imagination is a split album between experimental musicians Dominick Fernow under the pseudonym Prurient and Justin Broadrick (of Godflesh and Jesu) under the pseudonym JK Flesh. Released on vinyl on December 11, 2012, Worship Is the Cleansing of the Imagination was the final release of new material by Hydra Head Records, the label founded by former Isis member Aaron Turner, during its existence as a full time label.

Critical reception

Worship Is the Cleansing of the Imagination received positive reviews. Maya Kalev of Fact wrote that the album was a triumphal and fitting end to the Hydra Head label. Pitchfork writer Grayson Currin said, "These six tracks provide heaviness in a half-dozen different ways, a functional and fitting elegy for an imprint that achieved that mission with enviable consistency."

Track listing

Notes
 The US digital release of Worship Is the Cleansing of the Imagination puts track 7 as track 9 and displaces the others up.

References

External links
Worship Is the Cleansing of the Imagination on Bandcamp

2012 albums
Justin Broadrick albums
Prurient albums
Hydra Head Records albums
Albums produced by Justin Broadrick
Split albums